The 2017 L'Open Emeraude Solaire de Saint-Malo was a professional tennis tournament played on outdoor clay courts. It was the twenty-second edition of the tournament and was part of the 2017 ITF Women's Circuit. It took place in Saint-Malo, France, on 18–24 September 2017.

Singles main draw entrants

Seeds 

 1 Rankings as of 11 September 2017.

Other entrants 
The following players received a wildcard into the singles main draw:
  Audrey Albié
  Elixane Lechemia
  Alizé Lim
  Jessika Ponchet

The following players received entry from the qualifying draw:
  Marie Benoît
  Eleni Kordolaimi
  Irina Ramialison
  Kimberley Zimmermann

The following players received entry as lucky losers:
  Yvonne Cavallé Reimers
  Anastasiya Vasylyeva

Champions

Singles

 Polona Hercog def.  Diāna Marcinkēviča, 6–3, 6–3

Doubles
 
 Diāna Marcinkēviča /  Daniela Seguel def.  Irina Bara /  Mihaela Buzărnescu, 6–3, 6–3

External links 
 2017 L'Open Emeraude Solaire de Saint-Malo at ITFtennis.com
 Official website

2017 ITF Women's Circuit
2017 in French tennis
L'Open Emeraude Solaire de Saint-Malo
L'Open 35 de Saint-Malo